Jell may refer to:

Gel, an apparently solid, jelly-like material
Gelatin dessert, also known as jelly, a sweet or savoury food gel